Komsomolsky is a rural locality (a settlement) and the administrative center of Komsomolskoye Rural Settlement, Novonikolayevsky District, Volgograd Oblast, Russia. The population was 882 as of 2010. There are 15 streets.

Geography 
Komsomolsky is located in steppe, on the Khopyorsko-Buzulukskaya Plain, 9 km northeast of Novonikolayevsky (the district's administrative centre) by road. Ruzheynikovsky is the nearest rural locality.

References 

Rural localities in Novonikolayevsky District